Caulanthus inflatus, the desert candle, also referred to as squaw cabbage, is a flowering plant in the family Brassicaceae, native to the Mojave Desert of California and Nevada, and the southern Sierra Nevada and Transverse Ranges in the United States.

Description
Caulanthus inflatus is an annual plant growing up to 70 cm in height, with a thick, swollen stem that looks like a yellow candle. The basal leaves are 2–7 cm long, smaller higher up the stem. The flowers are small, with four reddish-purple petals.

References

Mojave Desert Wildflowers, Jon Mark Stewart, 1998, pg. 170

External links
Jepson Flora Project: Caulanthus inflatus
USDA Plant Profile: Caulanthus inflatus

inflatus
Flora of Nevada
Flora of the California desert regions
Flora of the Sierra Nevada (United States)
Flora of California